St. Augustine Elementary School may refer to:

Saint Augustine Elementary School (Laredo, Texas)
Saint Augustine Elementary School (Augusta, Kentucky)

See also
St. Augustine High School (disambiguation)
St. Augustine's College (disambiguation)
St Augustine of Canterbury School (disambiguation)
Colegio San Agustin (disambiguation)